Gentilly Terrace is a neighborhood of the city of New Orleans.  A subdistrict of the Gentilly District Area, its boundaries as defined by the City Planning Commission are: Filmore Avenue to the north, People's Avenue to the east, Dahlia Walk and Benefit Street to the south and Elysian Fields Avenue to the west. Gentilly Terrace may be further divided into Gentilly Terrace & Gardens, Edgewood Park and Fairmont Park, all three of which possess organized, distinct, and active neighborhood associations.

Geography

Adjacent Neighborhoods
 Milneburg (north)
 Gentilly Woods (east)
 Desire Area (east)
 St. Roch (south)
 Dillard (west)
 St. Anthony (west)
 Edgewood Park (south)

Boundaries
Orleans Parish defines the boundaries of Gentilly Terrace as these streets: Filmore Avenue, People's Avenue, Gentilly Boulevard and Elysian Fields Avenue.

Demographics
As of the census of 2000, there were 10,542 people, 4,258 households, and 2,783 families residing in the neighborhood.  The population density was 8,712 /mi2 (3,401 /km2).

As of the census of 2010, there were 8,210 people, 3,351 households, and 2,158 families residing in the neighborhood.

Education
New Orleans Public Schools supervises the two public elementary schools within the neighborhood, while Brother Martin High School offers an all-boys, Catholic education for grades 8–12. There are no public high schools within Gentilly Terrace.

Schools within Gentilly Terrace:

 Audubon Gentilly Elementary School (operated by Audubon Charter Schools/FAME, Inc.)
 Mary McLeod Bethune at Stuart Bradley Elementary School
 Brother Martin High School (operated by the Catholic Brothers of the Sacred Heart)

Nearby public high schools:

 Benjamin Franklin High School (New Orleans) (operated by Advocates for Academic Excellence in Education, Inc.)
 The Delores Taylor Arthur School For Young Men (operated by Lyceum Schools, Inc.) 
 John F. Kennedy High School at Lake Area (operated by New Beginnings School Foundation)
 McDonogh 35 College Preparatory High School

Nearby private schools:

 Holy Cross School (New Orleans)

Restaurants & Eateries 

The following list includes establishments located within Gentilly Terrace as well as others near the neighborhood:

Adrian's Bakery                         
Chinese Tea Garden                        
Daddy's Donuts                            
Daiquiris & Company                       
East of Italy                                                 
Good Time Sushi
Original Fiorella's Cafe                         
Pepperoni Ray's 
Sammy's Food Service & Deli
Sassafras on the Lakefront 
The Juju Bag Cafe
Yummy Sushi & Hibachi
Zimmer's Seafood

See also
 New Orleans neighborhoods
 Gentilly, New Orleans

==References==

https://beacon.schneidercorp.com/FileData/OrleansParishLA/AssessmentAreaMaps/GENTILLY%20TERRACE.pdf

Neighborhoods in New Orleans